Soothe My Sorrows Church is a Russian Orthodox church in Saratov, Russia. The church is located in the center of the city, on Volzhskaya Street and is one of the landmarks of the city.

The church was built between 1904 and 1906. The project was designed by  Pyotr Zybin and inspired by the architecture of the Saint Basil's Cathedral in Moscow.

References

Churches in Saratov Oblast
Russian Orthodox church buildings in Russia
20th-century Eastern Orthodox church buildings
Churches completed in 1906
1906 establishments in the Russian Empire
Objects of cultural heritage of Russia of regional significance
Cultural heritage monuments in Saratov Oblast